Mullion and Grade-Ruan was an electoral division of Cornwall in the United Kingdom which returned one member to sit on Cornwall Council between 2013 and 2021. It was abolished at the 2021 local elections, being succeeded by Mullion and St Keverne.

Councillors

Extent
Mullion and Grade-Ruan represented the villages of Mullion, Cadgwith and Lizard, as well as the hamlets of Trewoon, Kuggar, Poltesco, St Ruan, Church Cove, Ruan Minor and Mullion Cove. The division covered 4,960 hectares in total.

Election results

2017 election

2013 election

References

Electoral divisions of Cornwall Council